Arne Edvard Blomqvist (born 13 July 1921) is a Swedish former footballer who played as a defender. He made 59 Allsvenskan appearances for Djurgården scoring 3 goals.

References

Further reading
 

1921 births
Swedish footballers
Association football defenders
Allsvenskan players
Djurgårdens IF Fotboll players